Coelogyne tiomanensis is an epiphytic orchid. It is endemic to Peninsular Malaysia.

References

tiomanensis